Timothy Lancelot Fanshawe Royle (born 1931) was founder and chairman of the Control Risks Group.

He is the son of Sir Lancelot Royle KBE, educated at Harrow School and Mons Military Academy. He joined the British Army and served with the 15th/19th The King's Royal Hussars.

Royle was appointed CEO of the Hogg Robinson group in 1980 and left the company in 1981, leading a management buyout of the Control Risks Group.

References 

1931 births
People educated at Harrow School
English chief executives
15th/19th The King's Royal Hussars officers
Living people